Peraxilla is a genus of two showy mistletoe species from New Zealand.

Species list
Peraxilla colensoi
Peraxilla tetrapetala

References

Loranthaceae
Loranthaceae genera